Tooms Lake is a rural locality and a lake in the local government areas (LGA) of Northern Midlands, Southern Midlands, and Glamorgan-Spring Bay in the Central and South-east LGA regions of Tasmania. The 2016 census has a population of nil for the state suburb of Tooms Lake.

The lake is artificial and shallow, covering .

The lake was once a wetland and was a Tasmanian Aboriginal meeting place. The indigenous name for this place was moyantaliah (moy.en.tel.eea).

The lake can hold 25.362 gigaliters of water.  The catchment area is 60.2 km2. It is drained by the Tooms River, which flows into the Macquarie River. The lake is reached by the gravel Tooms Lake Road,  83 km from Hobart. Seaplanes land on the lake several times per year.

The lake is used for recreational fishing, for brown and rainbow trout.
Brown trout were introduced in 1904 and rainbow trout were released around 1908.  Trout are usually  with the largest .
Kuth Energy is drilling a geothermal energy exploration borehole in the area called Tooms1.

Other creatures found in Tooms Lake are Galaxias maculatus or jollytail.

Amenities
Amenities include a camping ground, boat ramp, public toilet and rubbish bin.  There are no shops or public phone service.
The lake is 468 m above sea level.

Water flowing from the Tooms Lake has an average electrical conductivity of 74 μS/cm.

History
On 6 December 1828 a massacre of Tasmanian aborigines occurred where ten were killed by nine soldiers from the 40th regiment.  John Danvers, the guide of the group, reported to the Oatlands police magistrate:
One of them getting up from a small fire to a large one, discovered us and gave the alarm to the rest, and the whole of them  up immediately and attempted to take up their spears in defence, and seeing that, we immediately fired and repeated it because we saw they were on the defensive part, they were about twenty in Number and several of whom were killed, two only were, unfortunately taken alive.
A woman and a boy were captured and the rest of the group escaped.

The dam on the lake was built by 40 men.

Tooms Lake is a confirmed locality.

Geography
The Little Swanport River forms part of the southern boundary. The lake is fully contained within the locality.

References

Resources
Archives Office of Tasmania

Towns in Tasmania
Reservoirs in Tasmania
Massacres of Indigenous Australians
Localities of Northern Midlands Council
Localities of Southern Midlands Council
Localities of Glamorgan–Spring Bay Council